James Ahern (17 October 1922 – 19 August 1988) was an Irish Gaelic footballer who played as a left wing-back for the Cork senior team.

Ahern made his first appearance for the team during the 1943 championship and was a regular member of the starting fifteen over much of the next decade. During that time he won one All-Ireland medal and two Munster medals.

At club level Ahern was a multiple county championship medalist with Clonakilty. Ahern died in August 1988 at the age of 65.

References

1922 births
1988 deaths
Clonakilty Gaelic footballers
Cork inter-county Gaelic footballers
Munster inter-provincial Gaelic footballers
Winners of one All-Ireland medal (Gaelic football)